Al Masirah ( al-Masirah, which means "The Journey") is a Yemeni TV channel which was founded and is owned by the Ansarullah movement (Houthis). The TV channel is headquartered in Beirut, Lebanon.

History 
The President of the board of Al Masirah is Mohammed Abdulsalam who is also Houthis official spokesman and their chief negotiator.

Al Masirah was founded by the Ansarullah movement (Houthis) in January 2012 in Beirut, Lebanon and is located next to Hezbollah’s Al Manar TV with backup studios at Hezbollah headquarters. On 8 October 2020, Twitter suspended the account of Al Masirah.

Theme 
Almasirah introduces itself as a network that "seeks to spread awareness and values of justice among different segments of Arab and Islamic societies in the context of the Qur'anic culture. It gives priority to the Palestinian cause. It works to support the causes of the vulnerable and counter the falsification of the media of the arrogant powers."

Channel frequency during Saudi-led coalition on Yemen 
On 10 May 2015, Al Masirah, along with other anti-Saudi channels, were closed on Nile Sat & Euro Sat several times due to Saudi pressure on the satellite companies, which made Al Masirah broadcast its signal instead on the Russian satellite Express AM 44. After several months of being banned on Nile Sat, broadcast is now online on Nile Sat.

Killed journalists and media workers 
After the Houthi takeover in Yemen, Al Masirah lost a number of employees due to conflict.

 On 4 January 2015 Al Masirah Journalist Khaled al-Washli was killed by an exploding bomb as he covered attempts to diffuse it.
 On 17 September 2015 Bilal Sharaf al-Deen was covering an airstrike, when he was killed by a following airstrike.
 On 21 January 2016, the 17-year-old TV cameraman Hashem al-Hamran was mortally injured by an air-strike by the Saudi-led coalition in the city of Dahian (Saada Governorate), when he was filming bombing raids for al-Masirah. He died from his wounds on 22 January 2016. The YJS, the IFJ and Irina Bokova, Director General of UNESCO, condemned the killing of Hashem Al Hamran.

U.S. Seizure of Online Sites
On June 22, 2021, United States law enforcement agencies seized a number of domains associated with al Masirah. The main website is now back online at almasirah.com.

See also
Television in Yemen
Ansarullah movement (Houthis)
List of journalists killed in Yemen

References

Arab mass media
Television in Yemen
Houthis
Television channels and stations established in 2012
Television stations in Yemen